Marcus Edward Printup (born January 24, 1967) is an American jazz trumpeter who attended the University of North Florida Jazz Studies program and went on to work with Betty Carter, Wynton Marsalis, The Clayton-Hamilton Jazz Orchestra, and Tim Hagans. In 1993, he became a member of the Jazz at Lincoln Center Orchestra led by Wynton Marsalis.

Discography
 Song for the Beautiful Woman (Blue Note, 1995)
 Unveiled (Blue Note, 1996)
 Nocturnal Traces (Blue Note, 1998)
 Hubsongs (Blue Note, 1998)
 The New Boogaloo (Nagel Heyer, 2002)
 Peace in the Abstract (SteepleChase, 2006)
 Bird of Paradise (SteepleChase, 2007)
 London Lullaby (SteepleChase, 2009)
 Ballads All Night (SteepleChase, 2010)
 A Time for Love (SteepleChase, 2011)
 Homage (SteepleChase, 2012)
 Desire (SteepleChase, 2013)
 Lost (SteepleChase, 2014)
 Young Bloods (SteepleChase, 2015)

References

American jazz trumpeters
American male trumpeters
Musicians from Georgia (U.S. state)
1967 births
Living people
21st-century trumpeters
21st-century American male musicians
American male jazz musicians
Jazz at Lincoln Center Orchestra members
Clayton-Hamilton Jazz Orchestra members
Nagel-Heyer Records artists
Blue Note Records artists
SteepleChase Records artists